Edward "Ned" Bullough (17 December 1866 – 6 July 1934) was an English rugby union footballer who played in the 1890s. He played at representative level for England, and at club level for Wigan (as he is a pre-1895–96 season rugby union player, no Heritage № has been allocated), as a forward, e.g. front row, lock, or back row. Prior to Thursday 29 August 1895, Wigan was a rugby union club.

Background
Ned Bullough was born in Wigan, Lancashire, and he died aged 67 in Manchester, Lancashire.

Playing career

International honours
Ned Bullough won caps for England while at Wigan in the 1892 Home Nations Championship against Wales, Ireland, and Scotland.

Change of Code
When Wigan converted from the rugby union code to the rugby league code on Thursday 29 August 1895, Ned Bullough would have been 28 years of age. Subsequently, he was not both a rugby union and rugby league footballer for Wigan.

References

External links
Search for "Edward Bullough" at britishnewspaperarchive.co.uk
Search for "Ned Bullough" at britishnewspaperarchive.co.uk

1866 births
1934 deaths
England international rugby union players
English rugby union players
Rugby union forwards
Rugby union players from Wigan
Wigan Warriors players